CoCo was a Japanese pop group which consisted of Mikiyo Ohno, Azusa Senou, Rieko Miura, Erika Haneda, and Maki Miyamae.

History
CoCo released their first single, "Equal Romance", on September 6, 1989. CoCo had a couple of their songs ("Equal Romance," "Omoide ga Ippai," and "Mou Nakanaide") as theme songs for the anime series Ranma ½. Azusa left the group in 1992 and went solo, while the other four stayed behind. Rieko and Maki released solo works but chose to remain in the group.
 
CoCo joined Ribbon, Qlair and a few solo idols for the "Otomejuku" concert. They performed Shochuu Omimai Moushiagemasu, among other songs.

Their final single "You're My Treasure" was released before they disbanded on August 3, 1994.

Discography

Singles

Albums

Studio albums 
 Strawberry (1990)
 Snow Garden (1990)
 STRAIGHT (1991)
 Share (1992)
 Sylph (1992)
 Sweet & Bitter (1994)

Compilation albums 
  (1991)
  (1993)
  series
  (2001)
  (2008)
  (2010)
  (2008)

Special albums 
  (1994) (as SAMPLE BATTLERS TOKYO featuring CoCo)

External links
 Official website (in Japanese)
 CoCo at MusicBrainz

Anime musical groups
Anime singers
Japanese dance groups
Japanese dance music groups
Japanese girl groups
Japanese idol groups
Japanese pop music groups
Musical groups established in 1989
Musical groups disestablished in 1994
Pony Canyon artists
Ranma ½